Christine Faith Roper (born 15 May 1990) is a Canadian rower. She was part of the team that won the bronze medal in the Women's eight and the silver in the "Women's four" competition at the 2014 World Rowing Championships. 

She was a member of the women's eights that won silver and bronze medals at the 2014 and 2015 World Rowing Championships, respectively.

In June 2016, she was officially named to Canada's 2016 Olympic team as part of the Women's coxed eight team. The team finished in 5th place.

After the Rio Olympics, Roper went on to represent Canada at the 2017, 2018 and 2019 World Rowing Championships. 
Over the course of her rowing career, she has medalled over 20 times at World Rowing events.

She represented Canada at the 2020 Summer Olympics. At the Olympics, Roper won the gold medal in the women's eights boat, Canada's first in the event since 1992.

Early life
Roper was born and raised in Jamaica. She migrated to the United States at the age of 14 to attend high school and was introduced to the sport of rowing. Roper moved to Canada after graduating from the University of Virginia in 2011 and began training with the national team.

References

External links

1990 births
Living people
Jamaican emigrants to Canada
People from Montego Bay
Canadian female rowers
Olympic rowers of Canada
Rowers at the 2016 Summer Olympics
World Rowing Championships medalists for Canada
Rowers at the 2020 Summer Olympics
Medalists at the 2020 Summer Olympics
Olympic medalists in rowing
Olympic gold medalists for Canada
21st-century Canadian women